Shaped by Fire is the seventh studio album by American metalcore band As I Lay Dying. It was released on September 20, 2019, through Nuclear Blast. The album was produced by the band themselves and is the follow-up to the group's sixth album, Awakened (2012). It is the first album in seven years after the band went on hiatus in 2014 when Tim Lambesis was incarcerated and sentenced to six years in prison for soliciting the murder of his estranged wife. It is also the last album to feature lead guitarist Nick Hipa before he left the band in 2020, and the last to feature drummer Jordan Mancino and bassist and clean vocalist Josh Gilbert, both of which left the band in 2022. Loudwire named it one of the 50 best metal albums of 2019.

Background and promotion
After Lambesis was released from prison on probation in December 2016 for attempting to hire a contract killer to murder his ex-wife, he began reaching out to the other members of the band looking to apologize in person starting with Mancino and Gilbert. After that he attempted to reconnect with Sgrosso and Hipa and eventually all four of them forgave him.

On June 8, 2018, the band released the music video for "My Own Grave". On April 12, 2019, the band released a music video for "Redefined", including a guest appearance by August Burns Red frontman Jake Luhrs. Two days later, the band announced the "Shaped by Fire" tour of Europe with support from Chelsea Grin, Unearth and Fit for a King running from September 2019 and concluding in October. On July 15, the band announced the North American dates of the "Shaped by Fire" Tour with direct support from After the Burial and Emmure to begin on November 15 at the House of Blues in Las Vegas and conclude on December 14 with a hometown show at the Soma San Diego. Details of the album, Shaped by Fire, were leaked through Nuclear Blast's European website with a projected release date. On August 9, the band officially announced their album, Shaped by Fire, would be released through Nuclear Blast Records, along with releasing the album's title track. On September 13, the band released "Blinded" as the album's fourth single along with an accompanying music video.

In March 2020, as a way of supporting their crew during the COVID-19 pandemic, they released an additional song, "Destruction or Strength", a B-side from this album's sessions. Two months later, in May, a music video for the song "Torn Between" was released.

Track listing

Personnel
Credits retrieved from AllMusic.

As I Lay Dying
 Tim Lambesis – lead vocals
 Nick Hipa – lead guitar, backing vocals
 Phil Sgrosso – rhythm guitar, backing vocals
 Josh Gilbert – bass, clean vocals
 Jordan Mancino – drums

Additional musicians
 Jake Luhrs – additional vocals on track 10
 Dominic Estes, Andrew Perez and Kevin Rowe – background vocals

Additional personnel
 As I Lay Dying – production, composition
 Tim Lambesis – vocal engineering
 Phil Sgrosso – guitar engineering
 Nick Hipa – guitar engineering
 Josh Gilbert – bass engineering, mixing assistance
 Drew Fulk – co-production (track 8 only)
 Adam Dutkiewicz – additional production, drum engineering
 Christian Cummings and Eoghan Ryan – assisting engineering
 Joseph McQueen – mixing, bass engineering, drum engineering, vocal engineering, percussion
 Adam "Nolly" Getgood – mixing (track 8 only)
 Ted Jensen – mastering
 Corey Meyers – artwork, layout

Charts

References

2019 albums
As I Lay Dying (band) albums
Nuclear Blast albums